UoE may refer to:
University of Edinburgh
University of Essex
University of Exeter
Unidad de Operaciones Especiales
 Use of English